The Galicia class are two landing platform dock (LPD) ships in service with the Spanish Navy. Built by Navantia at Ferrol, their mission is to carry out amphibious warfare by transporting the bulk of the Infantería de Marina. These ships have both a large helicopter flight deck and a  well deck for large landing craft, as well as a  space for up to 33 main battle tanks.

Galicia and Castilla are based at the Rota naval base in Spain.

The class is the result of a joint project between Spain and the Netherlands for developing a common class of LPD that would fulfill the needs of both countries to replace older ships.

Design and description
The project began in the Netherlands in 1990 as that country sought a solution to their LPD requirements. Spain joined the project in July 1991 and the definition stage was completed by December 1993. The Galicia class spawned from the joint Enforcer design with Spain's lead ship being authorised on 29 July 1994. The LPDs were designed to transport a battalion of marines and disembark them offshore and general logistic support.

The ships have a  electric plant comprising four diesel generators capable of creating  and an emergency  generator.

The Galicia class have a  flight deck capable of operating helicopters. The vessels have hangar area for four heavy or six medium helicopters. The LPDs usually sail with six AB 212 or four SH-3D helicopters embarked. They have a  well deck and are capable of operating six landing craft vehicle and personnel (LCVP) or four landing craft mechanized (LCM) or one landing craft utility and one LCVP. Normally, they operate with four LCM-1E craft. However, a maximum of 170 vehicles can be carried depending on size. Galicia can transport 543 fully-equipped troops and 72 staff and aircrew. Castilla can transport 404 fully-equipped troops and 72 staff and aircrew.

The LPDs are armed with two Oerlikon Contraves  cannon but can be fitted with four. They also mount six Sippican Hycor SRBOC MK36 chaff launchers. The Galicia class is equipped with KH 1007 air/surface search radar and AN/TPX-54 (V) Mk-XII (mode 4) identification friend or foe. Galicia has a complement of 115 with capacity for an additional 12 personnel. Castilla has a complement of 189.

Ships in class

Construction and career
The first ship, named Galicia, was ordered in July 1994 and laid down by Bazán (later Navantia) at their shipyard in Ferrol, Spain on 31 May 1996. The second vessel, named Castilla, was ordered on 9 May 1997 and laid down on 11 December. Galicia commissioned on 30 April 1998 and Castilla on 26 June 2000. Both ships are based at Rota naval base.

Galicia performed humanitarian aid operations to Central America following Hurricane Mitch from November 1998 to January 1999. Castilla participated in Operation Romeo Sierra in Perejil Island on 17 July 2002. Both vessels took part in the cleanup following the wreck of the tanker  and the resulting oil spill from December 2002 to February 2003. In 2002–2003 Castilla underwent a refit that improved the vessel's command, control and communications capabilities. In July 2003, Castilla transported the Spanish Legion to Ash Shuahyabah, United Arab Emirates as part of Operation IF, returning in September. The ship was then sent to provide humanitarian aid to Haiti as part Operation Mar Caribe from October to December 2004. From January to April 2005, Galicia was deployed to provide humanitarian aid in Iraq.

Galicia took part in Operation Respuesta Solidaria in Banda Aceh after the tsunami in northwestern Sumatra. This was followed by Operation Libre Hidalgo in support of United Nations peacekeeping in Lebanon. The LPD made two deployments, one in 2010 and another in 2011, as part of Operation Atalanta fighting piracy in the Indian Ocean and off the coast of Somalia. In April 2020, Galicia was deployed to Melilla, Spain to aid the city in the fight against COVID-19.

See also
 
 
 
 
 
 
 
 
 Type 071 amphibious transport dock

Notes

Citations

References

External links

 Naval-technology.com

 
Amphibious warfare vessel classes